Atoy is a small unincorporated community in east-southeast Cherokee County, Texas (USA), located between Rusk and the Angelina River along Farm to Market Road 343.

References

External links
 

Unincorporated communities in Cherokee County, Texas
Unincorporated communities in Texas